Roswell J. Morgan was a member of the Wisconsin State Assembly.

Biography
Morgan was born on August 29, 1867 in Embarrass, Wisconsin. He would later reside in Langlade County, Wisconsin.

Career
Morgan was a member of the Assembly during the 1903 session. He was a Republican.

References

People from Waupaca County, Wisconsin
People from Langlade County, Wisconsin
Republican Party members of the Wisconsin State Assembly
1867 births
Year of death missing